Andreas Isoz (born 17 February 1984 in Zurich) is a Swiss freestyle skier, specializing in  aerials.

Isoz competed at the 2010 Winter Olympics for Switzerland. He placed 14th in the qualifying round of the aerials event, failing to advance to the final.

As of March 2013, his best showing at the World Championships is 5th, in the 2007.

Isoz made his World Cup debut in March 2000. As of March 2013, his best World Cup event finish is 4th, achieved three times. His best World Cup overall finish in aerials is 8th, in 2007/08.

References

1984 births
Living people
Olympic freestyle skiers of Switzerland
Freestyle skiers at the 2010 Winter Olympics
Sportspeople from Zürich
Swiss male freestyle skiers
21st-century Swiss people